Kumarkhali (spelt Commercolly in old British Indian documents) is a town in Kushtia District in the Khulna Division of southwestern Bangladesh.

References

Populated places in Pirojpur District